Sangestan or Sangistan may refer to:
 Sangestan, Golestan
 Sangestan, Hamadan
 Sangestan, Kerman
 Sangestan, Markazi
 Sangestan Rural District, in Hamadan Province